Sultan Al-Anazi (born 26 April 2001), is a Saudi Arabian professional footballer who plays as a midfielder for Al-Qaisumah on loan from Al-Nassr.

Career
Al-Anazi started his career at the youth team of Al-Qaisumah and represented the club at every level. On 22 June 2020, Al-Anazi joined Al-Nassr from Al-Qaisumah and signed a four-year contract with the club.

On 9 September 2022, Al-Anazi joined Al-Qaisumah on loan.

Career statistics

Club

Notes

References

External links
 

2001 births
Living people
Saudi Arabian footballers
Saudi Arabia youth international footballers
Association football midfielders
Al-Qaisumah FC players
Al Nassr FC players
Saudi Professional League players
Saudi First Division League players
Saudi Second Division players